SM Arena may refer to two arenas in the Philippines, both owned by SM Prime Holdings:

 SM Mall of Asia Arena, Pasay, Metro Manila
 SM Seaside Arena, Cebu City